In military terms, 4 Squadron, IV Squadron or 4th Squadron may refer to:

 Aviation squadrons 
 No. 4 Squadron RAAF, a unit of the Royal Australian Air Force
 No. 4 Squadron (India), a unit of the Union of India Air Force
 No. 4 Squadron RNZAF, a unit of the Royal New Zealand Air Force
 4 Squadron SAAF, a unit of the South African Air Force
 No. IV Squadron RAF, a unit of the United Kingdom Royal Air Force
 4th Aero Squadron, later 4th Squadron (Observation), 4th Observation Squadron, 4th Reconnaissance Squadron, a unit of the United States Air Corps
 4th Fighter Squadron (United States), a unit of the United States Air Force
 4th Space Control Squadron (United States), a unit of the United States Air Force
 4th Space Operations Squadron (United States), a unit of the United States Air Force
 HS-4 (Helicopter Anti-Submarine Squadron 4), a unit of the United States Navy
 VMAQ-4 (Marine Tactical Electronic Warfare Squadron 4), a unit of the United States Marine Corps

 Naval squadrons 
 4th Battle Squadron (United Kingdom), a formation of the United Kingdom Royal Navy
 Submarine Squadron 4 (United States), a formation of the United States Navy

 Ground combat squadrons 
 2/4th Cavalry Commando Squadron (Australia), a unit of the Australian Army